{{Infobox book series
| name = World Migration ReportInforme sobre las Migraciones en el Mundo
| image = WMR2020.png
| image_caption = The cover of the 2020 report
| alt = The cover of the 2020 report
| author = International Organization for Migration
| country = Switzerland
| language = English, Spanish, French, Chinese, Arabic, and Russian
| publisher = 
| pub_date = 2000
| number_of_books = 10
| website = 
}}The flagship publication series of the International Organization for Migration, the World Migration Report presents data and information on human migration together with analysis of complex and emerging migration issues.

Released biennially, the World Migration Report 2020 is the tenth edition in the series.

History
The World Migration Report was first published by IOM in 2000 with the aim of promoting "a better understanding of the main migratory movements that are occurring across the globe." The first edition sought to achieve this aim by providing "an authoritative account of contemporary trends, issues, and problems in the field of international migration," presenting together a "review of trends in international migration in each major region of the world" with "a discussion of some of the main migration policy issues facing the international community."

The subsequent seven editions, published between 2003 and 2015, were published with specific thematic interests. The 2018 edition of the World Migration Report, the first published by IOM as the United Nation’s Migration Agency, restructured the report into two parts. The first part provides "key information on migration and migrants" through an exploration of the statistical data available on migration. The second part features several chapters that each feature a "balanced, evidence-based analysis of complex and emerging migration issues."

 Editions 

 World Migration Report 2020 
The World Migration Report 2020, the tenth in the series, retains the same structure as its predecessor, and similarly has the aim of contributing to increased understanding of migration throughout the world. The first four chapters are the same as in the 2018 edition, which provide updated migration statistics at the global and regional levels, while the second part considers different migration issues to those in the previous report:

 Migrants’ contributions to societies
 Migration, inclusion and social cohesion
 Migration and health
 Children and unsafe migration
 Migration and adaptation to environmental change
 Migrants caught in crises 
 Recent developments in global migration governance

 World Migration Report 2018 
Unlike the seven preceding reports which centred around a specific theme, the World Migration Report 2018 seeks to provide "both overview information that helps to explain migration patterns and processes, as well as insights and recommendations on major issues that policymakers are or will soon be grappling with."

The first part of the report consists of four chapters produced institutionally by IOM. It draws primarily upon analyses by IOM experts, practitioners and officials around the world, and compiles a wealth of data, information, and analysis with the aim of increasing the understanding of migration at both the global and regional levels. Conversely, the second part is authored by applied and academic researchers working on migration and mobility, and presents balanced, evidence-based analyses of complex and emerging migration issues. Specifically, the second section comprises the following chapters:

 Global migration governance frameworks: Existing architecture and recent developments
 Mobility, migration and transnational connectivity
 Understanding migration journeys from migrants’ perspectives
 Media reporting of migrants and migration
 Migration, violent extremism and social exclusion
 Migrants and cities: Stepping beyond World Migration Report 2015

 Thematic editions 
The seven editions of the World Migration Report released between 2003 and 2015 are organised around a core theme:

 World Migration Report 2015: Migrants and Cities, New Partnerships to Manage Mobility.
 World Migration Report 2013: High-level Dialogue on International Migration and Development.
 World Migration Report 2011: Communicating Effectively about Migration.
 World Migration Report 2010: The Future of Migration: Building Capacities for Change.
 World Migration Report 2008: Managing Labour Mobility in the Evolving Global Economy.
 World Migration Report 2005: Costs and Benefits of International Migration.
 World Migration Report 2003: Challenges and Responses for People on the Move.

 World Migration Report 2000 
Like the most recent editions of the World Migration Report, the 2000 edition is divided into two parts.

The first examines the scale of migration and characteristics of international migrants, including: the types of movements underway; the factors which contribute to migration; and the policy issues associated with these trends. In nine separate chapters, the second part reviews migration trends and recent policy developments in the major migration regions of the world. Alongside this discussion is an analysis of the integration of migrants, the consequences of irregular migration, and the extent of interregional cooperation between states.

 Uses of the report 

 World Migration Report 2020 
Media outlets such as CNN Español, the World Economic Forum and Reuters have published articles that utilize the World Migration Report 2020 as a resource to discuss contemporary migration trends.

 World Migration Report 2018 
The World Migration Report 2018 has been referenced in a wide range of peer-reviewed research outputs. The report has featured in articles released in the academic journal The Lancet on five occasions, as well as books released by Cambridge University Press and Oxford University Press. It has also been attributed as a source in reports produced by the Finnish government and Save the Children, The SAGE Handbook of International Migration, the United Nation's 2018 World Happiness Report and an Oxford Research Encyclopedia focusing on migrants and refugees in Africa.

In their guide “Immigration Data Matters,” the Migration Policy Institute recommended the report as a source of “current and historical estimates of international migrants by destination and/or origin.”

The 2018 Report was employed as a fact-checking resource against xenophobic claims on social media.

World Migration Report 2020
The World Migration Report 2020 is the tenth edition of the International Organization for Migration's flagship World Migration Report publication series. Released on 27 November 2019 at the 110th Session of the IOM Council, the report follows the same structure as the 2018 edition and seeks “to contribute to increased understanding of migration throughout the world.”"Launch of the World Migration Report 2020." IOM. https://www.youtube.com/watch?v=QSalb1x5jKE

 Chapters of the report 
The World Migration Report 2020 has 11 chapters, the first of which presents a number of highlights from the report and outlines the report's structure. The other 10 chapters aim to inform current and future policy deliberations and discussions by providing a clear identification of the key issues, a critical overview of relevant research and analysis, and a discussion of the implications for future research and policymaking.

Chapter 2 draws upon global sources of data to provide an overview of key figures and trends regarding the stocks and flows of international migrants, as well as remittances. After an initial review of overall migrant stocks and flows, the chapter looks at these trends for specific migrant groups, including migrant workers, refugees, asylum seekers, internally displaced persons, and stateless persons.

Chapter 3 focuses on key regional dimensions of, and developments in, migration in six world regions: Africa, Asia, Europe, Latin America and the Caribbean, Northern America, and Oceania. An overview and brief discussion of key population-related statistics, and a description of “key features and developments” in migration, is provided for each of these regions.

Recognizing that the ever-growing nature of migration research has made it difficult to determine which outputs are important and what should be given weight, Chapter 4 provides guidance to those seeking broad guidance on the subject. It conducts a comprehensive review of the migration research and analysis produced by actors, including individuals, academics, governments, intergovernmental organizations, and think tanks.

The fifth chapter aims to counter the fact “it is becoming increasingly difficult to hear balance perspectives in public debates on important policy issues, such as international migration” by “reflecting on the contributions that migrants have made, both to their communities of origin and destination.” It focuses on three types of contribution: sociocultural, civic-political, and economic.

Chapter 6 focuses on migrants’ social cohesion in destination countries, looking at how they adapt to new cultures, customs, social values, and language. It takes a local perspective, discussing the important role played by local actors and migrants themselves, and as well as the importance of policy settings that are directly and indirectly related to inclusion.

An overview of the key issues related to health and migration is discussed in Chapter 7. It recognizes that while migration can lead to a greater exposure to health risks, it can also lead to improved health. The relationship between migration and the health of the wider population is also considered, as are healthcare systems’ responses and the global governance of migration and health.

The focus of Chapter 8 is unsafe child migration, where migrant children do not accompany or follow the family in a safe environment. The different types and key drivers of child migration are reviewed, before a discussion of the main issues in confronting child migrants.

As extreme weather events and large-scale changes in infrastructure continue to occur, Chapter 9 looks at the ever-increasing role that environmental and climate change plays in decisions to migrate. After an exploration of the different perspectives on the issue, examples of environmental migration from a range of ecological zones – including mountainous, dryland and coastal areas, as well as cities – are provided.

While anybody may be affected by a crisis – including disasters, conflicts and political and economic crises – migrants are often among the most vulnerable and may require additional support. Chapter 10 therefore looks at the experiences of migrants in crisis contexts, and at the effectiveness of local, national, and international in meeting the different needs of migrants.

The eleventh and final chapter gives an update on the migration governance in the World Migration Report 2018'', documenting the key developments in migration governance in the two years since the last report.

Critical reception 
Upon release, the 2020 World Migration Report received widespread praise.

At the launch of the report, several IOM member states made positive statements. The Canadian government welcomed the publication of “such a valuable tool and reference” and noted that “the report is used by policymakers worldwide, including at all levels of the Canadian government, academia, and civil society.” The El Salvadorian government said that the World Migration Report demonstrates how data can be used to help understand “the basis characteristics of migration in these uncertain times.”

The World Migration Report's ability to counter misinformation and fake news was recognized by German ambassador, Michael von Ungern-Sternberg, who said he believed that it would contribute to a constructive discussion of migration and lay the ground for much needed international cooperation.

The report was also well received by newspapers, think tanks and academics. An editorial in the Africa Times said that the report delivered a “comprehensive assessment of migration drivers for Africa and the wider international community,” while Professor Leticia Florez Estrada, Professor of Sociology at Universidad Europa, noted how the report contained exhaustive and interesting research about migrants, refugees, minors, climate as a driver of migration, and fake news.

Jacqueline Bhabha, Professor at Harvard University, commented on the World Migration Report's encyclopedic nature, noting how several chapters were “perfect for introducing her students to new topics,” adding that they were “well-written and nicely researched.”

Population Europe, the network of Europe's leading demographic research centers, called the report a must-read for those “interested in migration statistics and trends.” Similar praise was given by Sam Grout Smith, of the UK Mission to the United Nations, who felt that the report contained “fascinating data and analysis on migration trends and good sections on tech and climate.”

Collaboration 
The report is a highly collaborative venture, drawing on expertise of IOM staff specialising in migration programme delivery, policy development and migration research and analysis, as well as leading migration researchers from around the world. The report was peer reviewed by IOM experts and senior migration academics, including:

 Dr Maruja Asis, Scalabrini Migration Center
 Prof Jørgen Carling, PRIO
 Prof Stephen Castles, University of Sydney
 Dr Howard Duncan, Canada Metropolis project
 Prof Gibril Faal, London School of Economics
 Prof Elizabeth Ferris, Georgetown University
 Prof Francois Gemenne, Sciences Po & University of Liège
 Prof Ian Goldin, University of Oxford
 Prof Sakiko Kanbara, University of Kochi
 Prof Susan Martin, Georgetown University
 Prof Marco Pedrotti, University of Neuchatel
 Prof Martin Ruhs, European University Institute
 Prof Nando Sigona, University of Birmingham
 Prof Ronald Skeldon, University of Sussex
 Dr Felicity Thomas, University of Exeter
 Prof Anna Triandafyllidou, Ryerson University
 Prof Cathy Zimmerman, London School of Hygiene and Tropical Medicine.

See also
 International Organization for Migration
 Human migration

References

External links
 World Migration Report

Human migration
2000 establishments